Rudensky (masculine), Rudenskaya (feminine) is a surname. Notable people with the surname include:

 Alexander Rudensky (born 1956), American immunologist
 Andrey Rudensky (born 1959), Russian film and theater actor
 Igor Rudensky (born 1962), Russian politician
 Morris Rudensky (1898–1988), American gangster